Symbiosis Institute of Management Studies, Pune, also known as SIMS Pune is a business school located in Pune, India. Constituent of Symbiosis International University, it offers full time MBA and Executive MBA programmes to Indian and international students.

India's only Institute for defence personnel and their dependents, SIMS Pune has some seats for civilian students. It is one of the three institutes in Western India with accreditation of 'Centre for Corporate Governance' of the 'National Foundation of Corporate Governance' (established by Ministry of Corporate Affairs and CII) and one of the few recognized as a center for Entrepreneurship by Department of Science and Technology, Govt. Of India. SIMS Pune is UGC approved and has been accredited in Grade 'A' by National Assessment and Accreditation Council (NAAC).

Established in 1993, the institute is an example of PPP (Public Private Partnership) between Symbiosis University and Government of India – Ministry of Defence since the year 2002. Admission to SIMS, Pune is granted on the basis of candidates' performance in SNAP.

History 
SIMS Pune was established in the year 1993 by Shri S. B. Mujumdar. Since June 2009, Rajiv Divekar is the director of SIMS Pune.

Institute Rankings

Events

Global Leaders Summit 
The annual Global Leaders' Summit (GLS), is the flagship corporate event organized by SIMS Pune each year. Running to its 10th edition in the year 2021, the event brings together several reputed industry corporates from across the globe from sectors such as IT/ITES, Manufacturing, Consulting, BFSI, E-Commerce and Media.

SIMSARC 
SIMSARC is the Annual International Research Conference organized by Symbiosis Institute of Management Studies (SIMS), Pune. The conference is aimed at bringing together researchers and scholars to participate, present or publish their research papers.
The salient feature of the review process of SIMSARC is its double-blind peer review. The conference has reviewers who are from the industry and academia world of India and abroad.

TEDxSIUKirkee 2019 
The 4th TEDx event of TEDxSIUKirkee was held at Symbiosis Institute of Management Studies, Pune on 15th December 2019 on the theme 'SURGE (Seek Uniqueness through Redefined Growth and Evolution).

Notable alumni 
 Prachi Mishra (Indian Model)
 Arantxa Sanchis (Indian Professional Snooker Player)
 Nikhil Khurana (Indian Actor)

References 

Symbiosis Society
Universities and colleges in Pune